Digital Access Signalling System (DASS) may refer to the following ISDN protocols created by British Telecom:
 Digital Access Signalling System 1 (DASS1)
 Digital Access Signalling System 2 (DASS2)